This is a list of the tallest buildings in the Ottawa—Gatineau urban area that are over 90 m (295 ft) tall. Despite its size, Ottawa–Gatineau does not have many skyscrapers that exceed  compared to other large Canadian cities. The National Capital Region has a complicated system of protected view planes that are governed by the National Capital Commission and adhered to by the City of Ottawa and Ville de Gatineau. Protected view planes limit the height of buildings in certain areas of the downtown cores of Ottawa and Gatineau to protect the prominence of the Parliament Buildings.

Tallest buildings in Ottawa—Gatineau
This includes spires and architectural details but does not include antenna masts.

Projects

Under construction 
This is a list of buildings under construction that will rise to over 90 m (300 ft) tall.

Approved 

Proposed

See also

 List of buildings in Ottawa
 List of tallest buildings in Canada
 List of tallest buildings in Ontario
 List of tallest buildings in Quebec
 Canadian Centre for Architecture
 Society of Architectural Historians
 Canadian architecture

References

External links
Skyscraperpage
Emporis.com

Ottawa-Gatineau

 
Buildings, tallest
Tallest buildings in Ottawa